Sultan Alauddin Riayat Shah ibni Almarhum Sultan Abdul Ghafur Muhiuddin Shah was the 13th Sultan of Pahang who reigned from 1614 to 1615. He seized the throne after killing his father, Abdul Ghafur Muhiuddin Shah and elder brother, the heir apparent Raja Abdullah. His name is identified based on the discovery of a treaty with his seal attached, in the Portuguese National Archives in Lisbon.

Life and reign
Alauddin was said to be the second son of Sultan Abdul Ghafur. Account on his name in local history is relatively unknown as it was never disclosed. Dong-Xiyang kao ('A study of the Eastern and Western Oceans'), a 1618 Chinese account written during the Ming dynasty recorded that he had killed his father and elder brother Raja Abdullah, and took the throne for himself. The Chinese account further describes his short reign with the increase in pirate activities sanctioned by the Sultan himself with the association of Brunei. Alauddin is also said to have improved the port facility to facilitate trade, when he erected a number of shops and merchant quarters.

In a treaty dated 16 August 1614, Sultan Alauddin, known as El Rey De Pao ('King of Pahang') entered into an agreement with Diogo de Mendonça Furtado, Capitão-mor of the Southern Seas, on behalf of the King of Portugal. It was from this document, that his name finally known to history, based on the seal on the document that bear his name.

Seal
The seal of Sultan Alauddin is written in Arabic with the centre engraved in relief and border in intaglio. Some of the words are unclear and indecipherable: 

Original Jawi text

Transliteration

Translation

The seal is regarded as the earliest known Islamic seal from the Malay peninsula.

Union with Johor
In 1615, in confirmation on their treaty with Johor at Malacca in August 1615, the Portuguese escorted Raja Bujang, a relative from Johor ruling house, to Pahang to take possession of the state. This Johor-Portuguese treaty angered Iskandar Muda, Ruler of Aceh, who after having sacked Johor's capital Batu Sawar a month later in September 1615, and put Sultan Abdullah to exile, devastated Pahang in 1617.

This development however seem at variance with the Chinese accounts which recorded that Sultan Alauddin was still ruling Pahang until 1618. However, at this time, Pahang was said to had become a piratical State in which revolts and disorder were rife.

Pahang was nominally merged with Johor in 1623 when Johor's Sultan Abdullah died and succeeded by his nephew Raja Bujang who later emerged as the new ruler of Johor as Sultan Abdul Jalil Riayat Shah III. In 1638, Abdul Jalil, in an attempt to reassert his claim, invaded Pahang and established his rule in the state. The event marked the complete union of Johor and Pahang, and the establishment of Johor Empire.

References

Bibliography
 

 

17th-century Sultans of Pahang
Monarchs who abdicated